JS Traput is a New Caledonian football team playing at the second level New Caledonia Second Level. It is based in Lifou.

Achievements
New Caledonia Division Honneur: 1
 1996

New Caledonia Cup 2: 
 1998, 1999

References
 

Football clubs in New Caledonia